The Caño Tomás Fault is a thrust fault in the department of Norte de Santander in northern Colombia.

Etymology 
The fault is named after Caño Tomás a vereda of Teorama.

Description 
In the northern part, the fault places agglomerates and breccias of Jurassic to Triassic age against shales and sandstones of Cretaceous age. Farther south, it places Precambrian gneisses and migmatites against Cretaceous and Jurassic to Triassic rocks. The thrust fault, with an approximate strike of 011.4 ± 8 and dipping to the west, displaces the erosion surface of the Eastern Ranges about  vertically according to a topographic survey that was done along the fault. This indicates that the fault has been active. However no displacement of Quaternary deposits were observed during aerial and land reconnaissance work by Page (1986).

See also 

 List of earthquakes in Colombia
 Bucaramanga-Santa Marta Fault

References

Bibliography

Further reading 
 

Seismic faults of Colombia
Thrust faults
Inactive faults
Faults